Frank S. Souchak, Jr. (April 30, 1915 – February 7, 2006) was an American professional football player and amateur golfer.

Souchak was born in Berwick, Pennsylvania. He attended the University of Pittsburgh where he lettered in basketball, football, and golf. In 1937, he was captain of the football team and earned All-American honors. He played in the 1938 East–West Shrine Game. He was drafted by the New York Giants in the 1938 NFL Draft but played for the Pittsburgh Pirates (Steelers) in 1939. He also was an assistant coach for the Steelers in 1946.

Souchak was also an amateur golfer who won several amateur tournaments, particularly in western Pennsylvania. His biggest moment came in the 1953 U.S. Open at Oakmont Country Club outside of Pittsburgh, Pennsylvania. He was a member of Oakmont and shot a first round 70 which put him in a tie for second place with George Fazio and Walter Burkemo, three strokes behind eventual champion Ben Hogan. Souchak ended the tournament in a tie for 9th place and was the low amateur. His younger brother, Mike Souchak, was a professional golfer won 15 times on the PGA Tour. The brothers won the team portion of the 1967 Bing Crosby National Pro-Am.

Souchak died in Pebble Beach, California where he had lived for 37 years.

Amateur wins
this list may be incomplete
1946 Western Pennsylvania Amateur
1947 West Penn Four Ball (with Jim Marks, Jr.)
1948 West Penn Four Ball (with Jim Marks, Jr.)
1951 West Penn Four Ball (with Hudson Samson, Jr.)
1952 West Penn Four Ball (with Hudson Samson, Jr.)
1967 Bing Crosby National Pro-Am (team with Mike Souchak)

References

External links

Pittsburgh Panthers football players
Pittsburgh Pirates (football) players
Pittsburgh Steelers coaches
Players of American football from Pennsylvania
American male golfers
Amateur golfers
Golfers from Pennsylvania
American men's basketball players
Pittsburgh Panthers men's basketball players
People from Columbia County, Pennsylvania
People from Pebble Beach, California
1915 births
2006 deaths